Clipse, also known as The Clipse, is an American hip hop duo, chiefly active from 1994 to 2010. It consists of brothers Gene "No Malice" and Terrence "Pusha T" Thornton. Pusha T was known as Terrar during the group's early years, while No Malice was originally known as Malicious, then changed his stage name to Malice soon after the group's formation, before changing it again to No Malice in 2012 following a conversion to Christianity. The duo were based in Virginia Beach, Virginia, and were heavily affiliated with producer and fellow Virginia Beach native, Pharrell Williams, who convinced the two in 1992 to be a rap duo instead of solo artists. Williams would go on to serve as their label head, main producer (via the production duo The Neptunes) and frequent guest artist through most of their career. The duo frequently rapped about the drug dealing they had done in their youth. Clipse was integral in establishing Virginia as one of the East Coast's strongholds in hip hop.

In 1996, with Williams' help, Clipse got a record deal with Elektra Records, and recorded what would have been their debut album, Exclusive Audio Footage. However, the album was shelved, and the duo dropped by the label, after poor sales for the album's lead single, "The Funeral".  In 2001, Williams signed the duo to Arista Records as the first artists on his recently-established Star Trak imprint. The duo released their debut album, Lord Willin', in 2002. It debuted at number 4 on the Billboard 200 and received widely positive reviews from critics. The album was certified RIAA gold 2 months later.

After a several-year delay due to record-label reshuffling, the duo's second album, Hell Hath No Fury, was released in 2006. Despite modest sales, it received widespread critical acclaim and is considered to be one of the best albums of the 2000s. A third album, Til the Casket Drops, was released in 2009. In 2010 the duo went on hiatus and both members pursued solo careers.

In 2019, Clipse officially reunited when they were guest artists on Kanye West's song "Use This Gospel". They have since then appeared as guest artists on several artists' songs, and No Malice appeared on Pusha T's song "I Pray For You" from his 2022 album It's Almost Dry.

History

1993–2000:  Formation and Exclusive Audio Footage
The Thornton brothers were born in The Bronx, and in 1979 their family moved to Virginia Beach. It was here that the brothers were exposed to the illegal cocaine trade, and this would become an essential part of their musical career. Malice started out as a solo act, formed the group Jarvis and was introduced to Pharrell Williams, one half of the production team the Neptunes. Impressed with his lyrical talents, Williams formed a working relationship with him. Pusha was just a bystander with his brother, but one day he decided to write a rap and perform. Malice and Pharrell were impressed with his talent, and it was Pharrell who suggested they should become a duo. Thus, the Clipse was born. However, in 1992 Malice went to serve in the Army to support his family. This was a hold up in the duo's plans, and it would not be until 1994 when Malice would return from his duties they would eventually start working together. Then, Pharrell Williams helped them secure a recording contract with Elektra in 1996. Under Elektra, and with the Neptunes handling its production, the Clipse recorded its debut album, Exclusive Audio Footage. The group's 1st single, "The Funeral", helped to generate fan interest in the album, but failed to make a significant chart impact. With "The Funeral" deemed a failure, Exclusive Audio Footage itself was shelved. The Clipse was released from Elektra shortly thereafter but promotional CDs of the album still exist and would get an official release on May 2, 2022 via Spotify.

===2001–2002: Breakthrough and Lord Willin'''===
In early 2001, Williams signed the duo to Arista Records through his recently established Star Trak imprint. With the backing of the record label and the Neptunes, Clipse proceeded to record material for their debut album. The lead single "Grindin'" was released on May 14, 2002, and was an instant hit. It peaked at number 30 on the Billboard Hot 100. The song would go on to become Clipse's most famous song, and many publications ranked the single highly on their year-end lists. The second single, "When the Last Time", was dropped on July 30. It would become the group's highest-charting song, peaking at number 19 on the Billboard Hot 100, and staying on the chart for 21 weeks. Clipse then released its commercial debut Lord Willin' on August 20, 2002. The album opened at Number 1 on Billboard's Top R&B/Hip-Hop Albums chart and Number 4 on the Billboard 200, selling 122,000 in its first week. On October 1, 2002—a month after its release—Lord Willin' was certified Gold by the RIAA. A third single, "Ma, I Don't Love Her" featuring Faith Evans was released on December 3, 2002. It was a modest hit, peaking at number 86 on the Billboard Hot 100, and staying on the chart for 6 weeks.

Also in 2002, Clipse were guest artists on Justin Timberlake's first solo single, "Like I Love You", another Neptunes-produced crossover radio hit. It peaked at number 11 on the Billboard Hot 100. Clipse also featured on the song "What Happened to That Boy" with Birdman. Pusha T featured in singer Nivea's 2nd single "Run Away (I Wanna Be with U)", which peaked at #47 in Australia. In 2003, Clipse went on tour with rapper 50 Cent.

2003–2006: Label dispute and Hell Hath No Fury
In late 2003, Clipse began recording material for their second album, Hell Hath No Fury. However, further work on the album ground to a halt in 2004, when Arista Records's urban artists were absorbed by its sister label Jive Records as part of a larger merger between Sony Music Entertainment and BMG. Due to contractual requirements, Clipse was forced to stay on Jive, while Star Trak and the rest of its roster moved to a new home at Interscope Records.

While Clipse resumed work on the album, and eventually finished its recording, the duo became increasingly frustrated with Jive, as the label overlooked it in favor of the more pop-oriented acts on its roster, which caused numerous delays in the release of Hell Hath No Fury. As delays continued, the group asked for a formal release from its contract. When Jive refused to grant this request, the duo sued the label. While the litigation took place, Clipse released new material through their legendary We Got It 4 Cheap mixtape series, which featured Clipse and Philadelphia rappers Ab-Liva and Sandman. The group was known collectively as the Re-Up Gang. We Got it 4 Cheap Vol. 1, which was the first official collection of new material from Clipse since the release of their debut album Lord Willin', was released in 2004 and received positive reviews from critics.  Vol. 2 of the series was released in 2005 received widespread critical acclaim. It is considered to be one of the best mixtape of the 2000s. Online music magazine Pitchfork placed the tape at number 130 on their list of top 200 albums of the 2000s, and number 2 on their list of the top 50 rap mixtapes of the millennium.

On May 9, 2006, Clipse finally reached an agreement with Jive Records. They were to release the album through its own Re-Up Records label along with Jive. They then toured with Ice Cube throughout May, and set the release date as August 29. Clipse dropped the first single, "Mr. Me Too" with Pharrell Williams on May 23, 2006. It peaked at number 65 on Hot R&B/Hip-Hop Songs chart. However, the release date of the album was pushed to October 31. On October 31, Clipse did not drop the album, instead dropped the single "Wamp Wamp (What It Do)" with Slim Thug. The song peaked at number 96 on Hot R&B/Hip-Hop Songs chart. Hell Hath No Fury was finally released on November 28, 2006. The album received universal acclaim with many publications citing it to be the duo's best. The hip hop magazine XXL gave the album a "XXL" rating, marking it as a five-star album. Only five albums had previously received that honor. The album currently holds an average score of 89 on Metacritic. It debuted at number 14 on the Billboard 200, selling 80,000 copies in its first week. The album would go on to receive high positions on many publications year and decade end charts, and is considered to be one of the best albums of the 2000s.

2007–2009: Columbia Records and Til the Casket Drops
In a May 19, 2007, interview with Eye Weekly, Clipse revealed that the group had been officially released from its recording contract with Jive. After this, the duo began discussions with several record labels, eventually signing with Columbia Records on October 26, 2007. On February 5, 2008, the duo released the 3rd installment in the We Got it 4 Cheap mixtape series as a free download on their website. On August 8, 2008, the duo released the Re-Up Gang's debut studio album, Clipse Presents: The Re-Up Gang through Koch Records. The album's first single, "Fast Life", was produced by Scott Storch. The single was originally slated for the duo's third album, but they felt it would be better used for the Re-Up Gang album. Only Malice and Pusha-T appear on the track. It is the only studio album from the group as after the release of the album, Sandman left the group.

In November 2008, Clipse announced the launch of their fashion line, Play Cloths. A mixtape called Road to Till the Casket Drops was released on December 1, 2008, in promotion of the line and their upcoming album.

Their final studio album, Til the Casket Drops was released on December 8, 2009. In a departure from the group's previous works, which only featured production from the Neptunes, the album features production from Diddy's production team the Hitmen, and DJ Khalil. The album did not fare as well commercially as the group's first two albums, peaking at number 41 on the Billboard Hot 200 albums chart, selling only 31,000 copies in its first week.

2010–present: Solo endeavors, hiatus, and return
At a concert on April 30, 2010, Malice announced that he and Pusha T would release solo albums later in the year. On September 12, 2010, Pusha T confirmed to MTV that he had signed to Kanye West's G.O.O.D. Music label. He would go on to work with Kanye on his 2010 album My Beautiful Dark Twisted Fantasy, and be featured on the hit single Runaway. He has gone on to embark a successful solo career and has released 4 studio albums. In 2015, he was named president of G.O.O.D. Music.

In 2011, Malice published his book Wretched, Pitiful, Poor, Blind & Naked. The book is a memoir about his life, including fearing contracting HIV, as well as his conversion to Christianity. In 2012, he changed his stage name to No Malice. He felt his previous name had a negative meaning and now wanted to spread positive messages. He collaborated with Lecrae on his mixtape Church Clothes, in the song "Darkest Hour". He also appeared on the music video for the Lecrae song off his "Lord Have Mercy", which features Tedashii and is from the 2013 Grammy Award winning Best Gospel Album Gravity. In 2013, he released his debut studio album Hear Ye Him via Re-Up Records. In 2016, he released the documentary The End Of Malice, which recalled the exact moment Clipse broke up and why. His second studio album, Let the Dead Bury the Dead was released in 2017 by REinvision.

Despite various rumors of a Clipse reunion, No Malice said at SXSW 2014 that the band was finished, that there would not be another Clipse album. However, in a 2016 interview, No Malice said, about the possibility of a reunion, "I'ma tell you that I learned to never say never, and I don't shut the door on anything. I really don't. In fact, I would like to see Clipse do it... I’ve said it before, my brother and I would definitely make clown soup out of all these MCs. Now that much I know."

In 2019, Clipse finally reunited to feature on Kanye West's album Jesus Is King on the track "Use This Gospel".
Pusha T expressed his feelings towards the duo collaborating again in an interview with Vulture, stating "I'm the younger brother, man. I mean, I'm happier than — I can't even express it!" He claimed that "The whole theme of the Jesus Is King album totally speaks to where my brother is". In 2022, Clipse reunited again to feature on Japanese fashion designer and DJ Nigo's album I Know Nigo, on the track "Punch Bowl" produced by The Neptunes. No Malice also featured on the track "I Pray for You" on Pusha T's 2022 album, It's Almost Dry; he was credited for this feature under the name Malice.

Lyrical content

Clipse's songs frequently discuss drug dealing, specifically cocaine, often using creative metaphors to refer to this activity. This has led some critics to refer to their style as "coke rap," along with other artists such as Raekwon and Young Jeezy. Other themes include clubbing, guns, sexual relationships and infidelity, and braggadocio.

Discography

Studio albums
 Exclusive Audio Footage (1999)
 Lord Willin' (2002)
 Hell Hath No Fury (2006)
 Til the Casket Drops'' (2009)

References

External links

 Official website
 Clipse at MTV

African-American musical groups
American musical duos
Sibling musical duos
Hip hop duos
Musical groups established in 1994
Musical groups from Virginia
Rappers from Virginia
East Coast hip hop groups
Male musical duos
1994 establishments in Virginia